Dharmavaram is a village panchayat in Srungavarapukota mandal of Vizianagaram district in Andhra Pradesh, India.

References

Villages in Vizianagaram district